is an ancient Japanese artform of knot-tying, most commonly used to decorate envelopes, called , which are given as gifts during holidays like Japanese New Year (and are then called ) or for special occasions such as births and weddings or funerals. The colour of the cord depends on the occasion, or may signify the religious denomination of the giver at funerals.

The stiff rice paper cord that is used, also called , is created by twisting lengths of rice paper together tightly, before starching them for strength and stiffness, and colouring them with mylar or thin strands of silk, or simply by painting the cord.

The art of  dates back to Japan's Asuka period, during which an envoy from the Sui dynasty brought gifts embellished with red and white hemp strings.

Other forms of  include using the cord to create paper jewellery, or creating three-dimensional art with different forms used for different auspicious meanings; cranes, frogs, fish, dragons and turtles are amongst the most popular.

In 2019, the Modern Mizuhiki Association was founded in Tokyo.

See also
 Japanese craft
 
 
 
 
 , envelopes typically decorated with 
 Red envelope

References

External links

Arts in Japan
Decorative ropework
Japanese words and phrases
Japanese crafts